Evgeny Isakov, sometimes shown as Evgeni Isakov, (born October 13, 1984) is a Russian professional ice hockey forward who played for Severstal Cherepovets of the RSL from 2002–04. Isakov played for Gazovik in Russia from 2004–2007. He was selected by Pittsburgh Penguins 161st overall in the 2003 NHL Entry Draft.

Career statistics

Regular season and playoffs

International

External links

http://penguins.nhl.com/club/player.htm?id=8470753&view=bio

1984 births
Living people
Dizel Penza players
Pittsburgh Penguins draft picks
Russian ice hockey forwards
Severstal Cherepovets players
Sokol Krasnoyarsk players
Sportspeople from Krasnoyarsk
HC Yugra players